Pedgaon  is a panchayat village in the state of Maharashtra, India.  Administratively, Pedgaon is under Shrigonda Taluka of Ahmadnagar District in Maharashtra. There is only the single village of Pedgaon in the Pedgaon gram panchayat.

The village of Pedgaon sits on the left (north) bank of the Bhima River, and on the west bank of the Deo River. The Deo River is an intermittent stream, running only during the monsoon season.  Three roads leave the village. To the east is the Anandwadi Road that connects to the south to State Highway 67 and to the north to State Highway 55. To the west there is the river road that passes through the villages of Ajnuj, Kautha, and Gar before reaching State Highway 10 and the bridge over the Bhima. The other western road goes northwest to Kasti. Pedgaon is 13 km by road east of the Kasti railway station, and 22 km by road south of the town of Shrigonda. There are no hotels or lodges in the village.

The village consists of one fort known as the Fort of Pedgaon, "Bahadurgad" or "Dharmaveergad". The fort is in total ruins. It contains one building known as Mastani Mahal. There are five temples in the fort, two of which are known as Lakshmi Narayan temple and Baleshwar Temple. Lakshmi Narayan temple is a good example of architecture with carved pillars, images of animals on the walls of temple. There is a good carving in the temple. Now there are no images in the temple. Another Baleshwar temple is dedicated to Lord Shiv. It is also in a ruined state. It contains 8 pillars with good carving. Fish farming is also done in Pedgaon in the Bhima River. River Saraswati flows from Shrigonda to Chorachiwadi to Pedgaon and meets Bhima river in Pedgoan.

History
Once, Shivaji Maharaj, founder of the Maratha Empire got the news that 200 first-rate Arab horses along with some riches had reached Bahadurgad (in Pedgaon). Bahadur Khan was the commander of the fort at that time. Shivaji Maharaj planned to loot the horses and the riches. He organized a force of 9000 and divided it into two- one of 2000 and the other of 7000. Bahadur Khan came to know about the proposed raid of Shivaji Maharaj and kept the main gate of the fort open and prepared his force. However, Shivaji Maharaj himself had arranged for the leaking of Marathas' plan of attacking Bahadurgad. Accordingly, 2000 Marathas entered the fort through the main gate. The watchful Mughals attacked the Marathas. However, Marathas were not interested in fighting and retreated. Bahadur Khan started chasing them. This was exactly what Shivaji Maharaj wanted. The fort was left defenseless. The second batch of 7000 Marathas attacked Bahadurgad. They quickly got hold of the 200 Arab horses and the riches, and fled. Moreover, Bahadur Khan could not catch hold of the retreating Marathas known for their speed and highly mobile nature of operations. Marathas were successful in deceiving Bahadur Khan and the Mughal forces.

Demographics  
In the 2018census, the village of Pedgaon had 8000 inhabitants, with 4500males (50.9%) and 3500females (49.1%), for a gender ratio of 964 females per thousand males.

References

External links 
 
 

Villages in Ahmednagar district